This is a list of NUTS 2 statistical regions of Slovakia by Human Development Index as of 2021.

References 

Slovakia
Slovakia